San Pedro de Angoares is a parish, and village, of the municipality of Ponteareas. According to the electoral register of 2004 it has a population of 482 inhabitants (253 women and 229 men). The parish church of San Pedro is located in the lugar of O Carballal.

Divisions
The village of Angoares is formed by 5 rural settlements known as aldeas or lugares.

 A Abelleiran
 O Carballal
 O Picón 
 As Searas
 A Valboa
 O Cabalón

Notable people
 Alfonso Pexegueiro, writer (1948–)

External links
 San Pedro de Angoares at Turgalicia.es

Churches in Galicia (Spain)